The 1915 Rock Island Independents season was the team's first season under manager/owner Walter Flanigan. The season resulted in the team posting a 5-1-1 record.

Schedule

References

Rock Island Independents seasons
Rock Island
Rock Island